The 2015 Mid Suffolk District Council election took place on the 7 May 2015 to elect members of Mid Suffolk District Council in England. It was held on same day as many UK local elections and the general election.

Election result

28 Conservative councillors became the governing group of the council (compared to 20-member minority administration with an opposition of 20 before the election) leaving 12 councillors in opposing groups.  Conservatives and Greens made gains.  Independents and Lib Dems sustained a net loss of five seats combined.  Labour and Suffolk Together councillors lost their total of three seats.  Two councillors (a Green and a Conservative) were re-elected by default as the only candidates nominated in the rural Haughley & Wetherden and Worlingworth wards respectively.

Ward results

Bacton & Old Newton

Badwell Ash

Barking & Somersham

Bramford & Blakenham

Claydon & Barham

Debenham

Elmswell & Norton

Eye

Fressingfield

Gislingham

Haughley & Wetherden

Helmingham & Coddenham

Hoxne

Mendlesham

Needham Market

Onehouse

Palgrave

Rattlesden

Rickinghall & Walsham

Ringshall

Stowmarket Central

Stowmarket North

Stowmarket South

Stowupland

Stradbroke & Laxfield

The Stonhams

Thurston & Hesset

Wetheringsett

Woolpit

Worlingworth

Wards
Wards of the United Kingdom have been relatively settled in this area and have articles or summarised under others as below:

Bacton and Old Newton Ward
Badwell Ash Ward
Barking and Somersham Ward
Bramford and Blakenham Ward
Claydon and Barham Ward
Debenham Ward
Elmswell and Norton Ward
Eye Ward
Fressingfield Ward
Gislingham Ward
Haughley and Wetherden Ward
Helmingham and Coddenham Ward
Hoxne Ward
Mendlesham Ward
Needham Market Ward
Onehouse Ward
Palgrave Ward
Rattlesden Ward
Rickinghall and Walsham Ward
Ringshall Ward
Stowmarket (Central) Ward
Stowmarket (North) Ward
Stowmarket (South) Ward
Stowupland Ward
Stradbroke and Laxfield Ward
The Stonhams Ward
Thurston and Hessett Ward
Wetheringsett Ward
Woolpit Ward
Worlingworth Ward

References

2015 English local elections
May 2015 events in the United Kingdom
2015
2010s in Suffolk